Burel Hill (‘Halm Burel’ \'h&lm 'bu-rel\) is an ice-free hill rising  in the northwest part of Desolation Island off Livingston Island in the South Shetland Islands, Antarctica. It surmounts Kozma Cove to the east, and Hero Bay to the south and southwest.

The hill is named after the Burel region in Western Bulgaria.

Location
It was mapped in 1968 by the British, and in 2005 and 2009 by Bulgaria.

Maps
 L.L. Ivanov et al. Antarctica: Livingston Island and Greenwich Island, South Shetland Islands. Scale 1:100000 topographic map. Sofia: Antarctic Place-names Commission of Bulgaria, 2005.
 L.L. Ivanov. Antarctica: Livingston Island and Greenwich, Robert, Snow and Smith Islands. Scale 1:120000 topographic map.  Troyan: Manfred Wörner Foundation, 2009.  
 Antarctic Digital Database (ADD). Scale 1:250000 topographic map of Antarctica. Scientific Committee on Antarctic Research (SCAR). Since 1993, regularly upgraded and updated.
 L.L. Ivanov. Antarctica: Livingston Island and Smith Island. Scale 1:100000 topographic map. Manfred Wörner Foundation, 2017.

References
 Bulgarian Antarctic Gazetteer. Antarctic Place-names Commission. (details in Bulgarian, basic data in English)
 Burel Hill. SCAR Composite Gazetteer of Antarctica

External links
 Burel Hills. Copernix satellite image

Hills of Livingston Island
Hills of Antarctica
Bulgaria and the Antarctic